Arthur Phipps is a jazz double-bass player. His extensive session credits include work with Sonny Rollins, Babs Gonzales, Bruce Lawrence, Roy Haynes, Don Redman, Linton Garner, Wynton Kelly, Jordan Fordin, J. J. Johnson, Bennie Green, Julius Watkins, Albert Socarras, Paul Chambers, Mal Waldron, Art Taylor, Fats Navarro, John Richard Lewis, Jackie McLean, David Amram and Jackie Mills.

Discography

Jackie McLean - A Long Drink of the Blues (Prestige, 1957)
Jackie McLean - Makin' the Changes (New Jazz, 1957)
Jackie McLean - Strange Blues (Prestige, 1957)

References

Jazz double-bassists
Bebop double-bassists
Living people
Year of birth missing (living people)
21st-century double-bassists